Yllätysten yö (English: "Night of Surprises") is the debut album by Matti Nykänen released in 1992.

Track listing
"Topless"
"Samaa nauhaa"
"V-tyyli"
"Mennään tanssimaan"
"Yllätysten yö"
"Kingi"
"Pidä varas"
"Jos sä haluut"
"Vain mäkimies voi tietää sen"

Matti Nykänen albums
1992 debut albums